Majchrzak is a Polish surname, it may refer to:
 Kacper Majchrzak (born 1992), Polish swimmer
 Kamil Majchrzak (born 1996), Polish tennis player
 Katarzyna Majchrzak (born 1967), Polish high jumper
 Krzysztof Majchrzak (born 1948), Polish film actor

Polish-language surnames